The Barossa Valley railway line is a railway line with several branches, running from Gawler into and through the Barossa Valley. The original terminus was at Angaston. A branch was built from Nuriootpa via Stockwell to Truro, and a further branch from that to Penrice. The Angaston and Truro branches are closed and removed; the line to Penrice remains but has not been used since 2014.

History
The Angaston line opened from Gawler through Nuriootpa to Angaston in 1911.

The line from Nuriootpa to Truro opened on 24 September 1917. Before it had been built, there was public discussion about it continuing to Dutton, Steinfeld and Sedan. The Truro line had also at various times been proposed to be extended to the Murray River at Blanchetown, but this was rejected in 1923.

By November 1950, a branch line from Light Pass on the Truro line to Penrice Quarry was built. The Truro line closed to passengers on 16 December 1968. Some freight trains and special tours by the Australian Railway Historical Society (ARHS) used the line to Truro until 1979 when Australian National declared the line unsafe. In the late 1970s the Truro line became the branch line and the Penrice line the mainline. The last ARHS special to operate past Penrice Junction was on 20 September 1981, when Rx 207 worked to Stockwell.

From 1987, the line beyond Stockwell was used to store surplus rolling stock. It was later removed and the track between there and Truro lifted. Remaining rollingstock between Penrice Junction and Stockwell was cleared during February 1990; with that section of line also being closed and later taken up. The line past Penrice junction was officially declared closed during 1992. Some relics of the line remain today. In 2010, the track between Angaston and Nuriootpa was lifted and a shared bike and pedestrian path was put in place.

Bulk cement was transported by rail from the Adelaide Brighton Cement works adjacent to the railway line east of Stockwell Road on the western side of Angaston until the mid-1990s.

Since the cessation of the Penrice Stone Train to Penrice Quarry in June 2014, the line has been booked out of use.

Services
Regular passenger services ceased in the 1970s. In November 1996, TransAdelaide introduced a trial Sundays only service to Nuriootpa. Later, the heritage Barossa Wine Train ran from Adelaide to Tanunda with Bluebird railcars. This ceased in April 2003. Commuter passenger services were earlier withdrawn on 16 December 1968.

In March 2015, it was revealed that a consortium were seeking to resurrect the Barossa Wine Train and had an option to purchase three Bluebird railcars. This has since proven to be unsuccessful with the Wine Train railcars being sold to Aurizon.

Stations
There were a total of 7 stopping places on the line between Gawler and Angaston.
North Gawler (now Gawler Central railway station)
Sandy Creek
Lyndoch
Rowlands Flat
Tanunda
Nuriootpa
Angaston
On the Truro branch:
Stockwell ( from Nuriootpa)
Truro ( from Nuriootpa)

References

Closed railway lines in South Australia
Railway lines opened in 1911
Railway lines opened in 1917
Railway lines closed in 2014
Railway lines in South Australia
1911 establishments in Australia